Captain Beyond is the debut album by Captain Beyond, an American rock supergroup featuring former members of Iron Butterfly, Deep Purple, Johnny Winter. Released in 1972, the album cover for the U.S. release included 3-D artwork (using lenticular printing). The album was dedicated to the memory of Duane Allman, who Captain Beyond drummer Bobby Caldwell had played with in an informal capacity.

Captain Beyond is unique among guitar-driven hard rock albums in that it contains a wide range of influences, including Latin and jazz, often with various time signatures and a broad range of dynamics within the same song. Most of the album consists of three medleys of tightly arranged interconnected songs. The first starts with "Dancing Madly Backwards (on a Sea of Air)" and ends with "Myopic Void". The second starts with "Thousand Days of Yesterdays (Intro)" and ends with "Thousand Days of Yesterdays (Time Since Come and Gone)". The third starts with "I Can't Feel Nothin' (Part 1)" and finishes the album. Songs flow directly into each other without any lag time between selections, a feature that is shared with other more progressive bands of the era such as The Moody Blues and Jethro Tull.

All of the songwriting was credited to lead vocalist Rod Evans and drummer Bobby Caldwell. However, the songs were in fact written by the group as a whole. Due to their still binding contracts with Iron Butterfly, guitarist Larry Reinhardt and bassist Lee Dorman could not be listed as songwriters on this record for legal reasons.

Track listing

Personnel
Captain Beyond
 Rod Evans – lead vocals
 Larry "Rhino" Reinhardt – guitars
 Lee Dorman – bass, backing vocals, piano
 Bobby Caldwell – drums, percussion, bells, vibraphone, backing vocals, piano

References

Album Design - Pacific Eye and Ear

External links
 The Deep Purple Podcast - Episode #23 - Captain Beyond - Captain Beyond
Captain Beyond on Discogs 

Captain Beyond albums
Capricorn Records albums
1972 debut albums